Artery dissection may refer to:

 Aortic dissection
 Carotid artery dissection
 Coronary artery dissection
 Vertebral artery dissection